Crepidium fontinale, commonly known as the yellow spur orchid, is a plant in the orchid family and is endemic to the Northern Territory. It is an evergreen, terrestrial orchid with a fleshy stem, wavy leaves and many yellowish green flowers crowded on a green flowering stem.

Description
The petals are a linear in shape and similar in size to the sepals. Flowering occurs between January and February.

Taxonomy and naming
Crepidium fontinale was first formally described in 2006 by David Jones and Mark Clements from a specimen collected from the Black Jungle in the Northern Territory. The specific epithet (fontinale) is a Latin word meaning "of a spring", referring to the preferred habitat of this orchid.

The species has previously been known as Malaxis acuminata which occurs in Southeast Asia but has been shown to be genetically and morphologically distinct from that species.

Distribution and habitat
The yellow spur orchid grows in moist areas, especially near springs in dense rainforest and is found in northern parts of the Northern Territory including Bathurst Island.

Conservation
This orchid is conserved in national parks.

References 

fontinale
Orchids of Queensland
Plants described in 2006